Boonville Township may refer to the following townships in the United States:

 Boonville Township, Cooper County, Missouri
 Boonville Township, Yadkin County, North Carolina